Marshall Wells (February 20, 1912 – June 16, 1972) was an American football and basketball coach. He served as the head football coach at Millikin College in Decatur, Illinois from 1940 to 1941 and again from 1946 to 1957, compiling a record of 18–13–1. Wells was also a faculty member and head basketball coach at Millikin.

Playing career
Wells played college football at the University of Minnesota for the Golden Gophers from 1930 to 1933. He played under the tutelage of two head coaches: Fritz Crisler, who had a 7–3 record his in 1931, his last year at Minnesota, and Bernie Bierman, who led the team to a share of the Big Ten Conference title in 1933.

Head coaching record

Football

References

External links
 

1912 births
1972 deaths
American football tackles
Basketball coaches from Wisconsin
Colorado Buffaloes football coaches
Hamline Pipers football coaches
Iowa State Cyclones football coaches
Millikin Big Blue athletic directors
Millikin Big Blue football coaches
Millikin Big Blue men's basketball coaches
Minnesota Golden Gophers football coaches
Minnesota Golden Gophers football players
Sioux Falls Cougars football coaches
Sioux Falls Cougars men's basketball coaches
Yale Bulldogs football coaches
Millikin University faculty
Players of American football from Wisconsin